Ancône is a commune in the Drôme department in southeastern France.

Population

See also
Communes of the Drôme department

References

Communes of Drôme
Dauphiné